Mykola Berezutskiy (born 22 March 1937) is a Ukrainian hurdler. He competed in the men's 110 metres hurdles at the 1960 Summer Olympics representing the Soviet Union.

References

External links
 

1937 births
Living people
Athletes (track and field) at the 1960 Summer Olympics
Ukrainian male hurdlers
Soviet male hurdlers
Olympic athletes of the Soviet Union
Place of birth missing (living people)